St Columba's College is a co-educational independent day and boarding school founded in 1843 located in Whitechurch, County Dublin, Ireland. Among the founders of the college were Viscount Adare (who later became The 3rd Earl of Dunraven and Mount-Earl in 1850), William Monsell (who was later created The 1st Baron Emly in 1874), Dr William Sewell and James Henthorn Todd.

The school is affiliated with the Church of Ireland and caters to 300+ pupils, aged 11 to 19. Alumni are organized in the Old Columban Society.

The school has grown up around a series of quadrangles, and major developments since the 1993 150th anniversary have provided it with many modern facilities. In 2004 it opened the Grange Building, housing over 100 boarders, as well as classrooms and house staff accommodation. In 2006, the 19th century Argyle buildings in the heart of the College were refurbished.

The old Cadogan Building opened in January 2008 as a new music school.  Academic standards are high; in 2006, the average points score by all Leaving Certificate candidates was 440 out of 625, and in 2007 this went up slightly to 442. In 2008 it was 424, in 2009 446, and in 2010 the highest yet at 459. Over the past five years the average has been: 442 points. Average class size is 12 pupils per teacher. The Sunday Independent newspaper has identified it as the most expensive school in Ireland.

History
The school was originally established at Stackallan House in County Meath in 1843 but moved to its current location at Whitechurch, County Dublin in 1849.

House system
St Columba's operates a house system. Each pupil is placed in one of seven houses; Stackallan, Glen or Gwynn for all boys Form II to VI; Hollypark or Iona for all girls; Beresford for junior girls; Tibradden for boys under 13.  The size of house ranges from 20 to 65 pupils. A Housemaster or Housemistress, assisted by at least one resident House Tutor, is in charge of each house, and acts in loco parentis in every aspect of the children's welfare throughout their time at the college.

Tibradden and Beresford occupy separate buildings in the centre of the college. Like the senior houses each has its own living and sleeping quarters and routine. Older boys and girls, selected by the house staff, help to provide an existence more structured and more protected than that of the rest of the school.

Terms
The school year is divided into three terms of which the first, the Michaelmas Term (September to December) is the longest. The Hilary Term is from January to March. The third is the Trinity Term, from April to June, and this is when external public examinations are taken. The Michaelmas Term has a substantial holiday at half-term, when the college closes down.

There are also shorter half-term breaks in the other terms, including following the St Columba's Day celebrations in late May or early June. Each term there is a three- or four-day Exodus during which the college closes; most pupils from outside of Ireland stay with their guardians, or Irish school friends.

Old Columban Society
Founded in 1909, the Old Columban Society is the alumni organization of the college. The first president of the society was Acting-Warden R M Gwynn supported by OCs W.F.S. Bantry White and Cecil L. Smith. It keeps members in touch with each other and the college and has also published books about the history of the college. The school magazine TheColumban was first published in 1879. During the First World War it denounced the Easter Rising. Many OCs were officers in the British Army, so that when one of them died the bell in college was rung in commemoration. In 1917, a Treasurer was appointed to oversee editorials and printing.

Each year in May the Old Columban Bulletin is published, containing about 25 pages of news of Old Columbans and the college. Regular dinners and drinks parties are organised, in Dublin, London and Belfast. An Old Columban Scholarship is awarded to children of Old Columbans, who are all entitled to a discount on College fees.

Currently they have over 3,000 members, of whom over 50% live in the Republic of Ireland, 5% in Northern Ireland, 16% in Great Britain, 5% in continental Europe and 7% in the rest of the world.  Old Columbans Germany has established a website, and is organizing events for Old Columbans from Germany as well as Old Columbans living in Germany.

Notable past pupils

Robert Babington, Ulster Unionist politician and judge
Arthur W. Barton, a school benefactor
Christopher Barton, rower (won The Boat Race and an Olympic silver medal in 1948)
Marcus de la Poer Beresford, 7th Baron Decies, an Anglo-Irish hereditary peer
John S. Beckett, musician, composer and conductor
Michael Biggs, sculptor
 Robert Blackburn, educationalist 
Sir Dermot Boyle, Marshal of the Royal Air Force
Thomas Chamney, former Olympic track and field athlete 
Adam Clayton, musician (U2)
Brian Faulkner, Prime Minister of Northern Ireland
Jasmine Guinness, designer and fashion model
Edward Gwynn, scholar
Stephen Gwynn, writer and author
E. Chambré Hardman, pictorialist photographer
Christopher Robin Haskins, Baron Haskins, businessman, life peer, and former member of the British Labour Party
Joseph Hone, writer, professor
Rex Ingram, director
Richard Claverhouse Jebb, classicist
Roy Johnston, Irish physicist
William John Leech, painter
Charles Marriott, International cricketer
Ian McKinley, International rugby player
Sir Kenneth O'Connor, President of the East African Court of Appeal
Harry Read, rugby union international and first-class cricketer
Alan Ruddock, journalist, editor of The Sunday Times Ireland, and The Scotsman
Patrick Scott, artist
Victoria Smurfit, actress
Holly Somerville, botanical illustrator and artist
William Trevor, KBE, writer
Peter Wyse Jackson, botanist
Ivan Yates, politician, former TD
Michael Yeats, barrister and Fianna Fáil politician

Wardens
 Robert Corbet Singleton (1843–47)
 M.C. Morton (1848–50)
 George Williams (1850–56)
 John Gwynn (1856–64)
 John Longden (1864–67)
 Robert Rice (1867–91)
 Percy Whelan (1891-1904)
 William Parker (1904–08)
 R.M. Gwynn (1909-09), Acting-Warden
 William Blackburn (1909–19)
 R.M. Gwynn, (1919-1919) Acting-Warden
 C.B. Armstrong (1919–33)
 C.W. Sowby (1933–49)
 F.M. Argyle (1949–74)
 D. Gibbs (1974 - 1988)
 T. E. Macey (1988 - 2001)
 Lindsay Haslett (2001-2016)
 M. Boobbyer (2016–present)

References

External links
 
English department blog
Science department website
Old Columbans Germany

Secondary schools in County Dublin
Anglican schools in the Republic of Ireland
Boarding schools in Ireland
Educational institutions established in 1843
Member schools of the Headmasters' and Headmistresses' Conference
Private schools in the Republic of Ireland
1843 establishments in Ireland